The Besshatyr Kurgan (the royal burial mounds of Besshatyr) in Kazakhstan is a complex of tombs of the Semirechye-Saka tribe era.  From the Kazakh language, "Besshatyr" translates as "Five Tents" which is most likely derived from the number of the largest mounds in this area.

The mounds are located in the valley of the Ili River on the territory of the Altyn-Emel National Park in the Kerbulak district, Almaty region.

Description
These burial grounds date to the 6th to 4th centuries BC. 

The big Besshtyrski mound is the largest of the mounds. The mound has the shape of a truncated body and a stone layer at the base. The mound is surrounded by 94 ring fences made of stone pillars-menhirs and large boulders in a spiral. Some of the menhirs have tamgas of Kazakh families painted on them. In one of the mounds was a wooden building made of massive trunks of Tien Shan firs.

Archaeology
The first mention of the necropolis was by Vladimir Gorodetsky in 1924. About 33 years later the burial grounds were first investigated by an archaeological expedition led by K. Akishev from 1959 to 1961. Archaeologists have established that the mound includes thirty-one large and small burial grounds. Twenty-one burial grounds are covered with stone, ten with a layer of rubble and clay. 

Conventionally, burial grounds divided into northern and southern ones. Six of the twenty mounds are fenced with a chain of 45 fences made of stone slabs and small stones. There are images of mountain goats, wild boars, wolves, and other animals, as well as other markings on a variety of plates. There are also symbols of the sun and circles depicting the Kazakh Tamga "eye". There found complex of underground passages with a total length of  6 large mounds.

According to scientists, the Besshatyr complex was a sacred place for the Saka tribes, who for centuries have performed religious ceremonies, various religious rites, and offered sacrifices there. Barrows were not only a place of burial, but also a place of religious rites. Studies of 18 burial grounds of different sizes have given valuable scientific information about social groups, economy, life, customs, religious beliefs, architecture, weapons and equipment of the Saka tribe. In small burial grounds were buried ordinary soldiers and ordinary people. Military leaders and famous warriors were interred in the middle ones. Large burial grounds were intended for the burial of civilian and military leaders of the Saka tribes.

Area
Next to the burial ground at Besshatyr are situated the Saka burial grounds Kzylauyz, Altyn-Emel, and Karashoky.  to the southeast are located burials from a later period: Besshatyr Usuns II, consisting of 33 mounds; Kalkan I, with 118 burial vaults, and in the area of the Altyn-Emel pass, cemeteries of the same name, with 36 mounds. From this, it appears that the Saka tribe of Semirechye moved only in the warm season, and with the onset of winter, they went to wintering places. This gives new knowledge about the culture of the Saka tribes of Semirechye.

References

Sources
 Бесшатыр, Казахстан. Национальная энциклопедия. — Алматы: Қазақ энциклопедиясы, 2004. — Т. I. —  
 Железный век // Казахстан. Национальная энциклопедия. — Алматы: Қазақ энциклопедиясы, 2005. — Т. II. —

External links
 Акишев К. А., Кушаев Г. А.. Древняя культура саков и усуней долины реки Или, А. А.. 1963 
 Акишев К. А., Социальная структура сакского общества VI—IV вв. до н. э. // Археологические памятники на Великом Шелковом пути, А., 1993 

Tumuli in Kazakhstan
Buildings and structures in Almaty Region